The women's 5000 metres at the 2011 Asian Athletics Championships was held at the Kobe Universiade Memorial Stadium on 9 July.

Results

References
Results

5000 metres
5000 metres at the Asian Athletics Championships
2011 in women's athletics